Charlies Creek is a stream in the U.S. states of Georgia and North Carolina. It is a tributary to the Tallulah River.

Charlies Creek was named after Charles R. Hicks (1767–1827), Second Principal Chief of the Cherokee Nation. Variant names are "Charles Creek", "Charlie Creek", and "Charlie's Creek".

References

Rivers of Georgia (U.S. state)
Rivers of Towns County, Georgia
Rivers of Clay County, North Carolina
Rivers of North Carolina